Flyte Tyme Records is the record label started by producers Jimmy Jam and Terry Lewis. It is now part of Universal Records.

See also 
 List of record labels

External links
Official Website

American record labels
Pop record labels